Karhijärvi is a lake in Finland. It is situated in the region of Satakunta in western Finland and there in the municipality of Lavia. It is part of the Karvianjoki basin. It has an area of 33.35 km2 and a surface elevation of 52.1 m.

References

See also
List of lakes in Finland

Karvianjoki basin
Landforms of Satakunta
Lakes of Lavia, Finland